Zero Zero was an alternative comics anthology published by Fantagraphics Books from 1995 to 2000. It was printed in a typical 6½″ × 9¾″ comic book format. Issues ranged between 40 and 64 pages in length, printed mostly in black-and-white with a color cover but occasionally including sections printed in one or two colors, notably a series of stories by Al Columbia. Its release schedule fluctuated between bimonthly and quarterly intervals over the course of its run.

A significant proportion of Zero Zero'''s pages were given over to serialized works, including Richard Sala's The Chuckling Whatsit, Dave Cooper's Crumple, Mack White's Homunculus, Kaz and Timothy Georgarakis's Meat Box, and Kim Deitch's The Strange Secret of Molly O'Dare and The Search for Smilin' Ed. Derf Backderf's short strip "My Friend Dahmer", which he later expanded to an award-winning graphic novel of the same name, also appeared in its pages.

Early issues of Zero Zero were not numbered, but the back cover of each issue featured a captioned illustration depicting an ordinal "Sign of the Impending Apocalypse" which also served as an ad hoc'' numbering system. For the twenty-seventh and final issue this feature was replaced with an Al Columbia strip, "Vladimir Nabokov's 'Cheapy the Guinea Pig'", depicting the killing of an experimental subject.

Contributors

 Doug Allen
 Rick Altergott
 Max Andersson
 Marc Arsenault
 Derf Backderf
 Peter Bagge
 Jim Blanchard
 Stephane Blanquet
 David Collier
 Al Columbia
 Dave Cooper
 Kim Deitch
 Mike Diana
 Michael Dougan
 Joyce Farmer
 Drew Friedman
 Bill Griffith
 Glenn Head
 Sam Henderson
 Kaz
 Michael Kupperman (as "P. Revess")
 David Mazzucchelli
 Mark Newgarden
 Gary Panter
 Ethan Persoff
 Archer Prewitt
 Spain Rodriguez
 Joe Sacco
 Richard Sala
 Ted Stearn
 Henriette Valium
 Penny Van Horn
 Mack White
 Skip Williamson
 Aleksandar Zograf

References 
 

Comics anthologies
1995 comics debuts
Fantagraphics titles